Thomas Abel or Abell (c. 1497–1540), was an English priest.

Thomas Abel is also the name of:
Thomas Abel (footballer) (born 1974), Danish former professional association football player
Tom Abel (born 1970), German cosmologist
Tom Abel (cricketer) (1890–1937), first class cricketer